"Sorry" is a song by American rock band Buckcherry. It is their fifth and final single from their third album, 15. It was not originally planned to be a single, but after increasing popularity on mainstream radio, the band made a video and officially released the song in November 2007.

Chart performance
"Sorry" was highly successful on mainstream radio and in digital sales, reaching the top 10 on the Billboard Hot 100 at number nine and ranked number 44 on the Billboard Year-End chart of 2008, becoming only the second song of the band's career to chart on the Hot 100, and besting the number 59 peak of their first Hot 100 charter "Crazy Bitch". 

It is their first Hot 100 top 10 hit. It is their first top 10 hit on the Pop 100 as well, reaching number eight. In addition, it has reached number two on the Adult Top 40, becoming the first Buckcherry single to register on that chart. 

It is the second Buckcherry song to enter the Canadian Hot 100 chart, where it debuted at number 97 and climbed to number seven, their first top 10 single there. It debuted on Mainstream Rock Tracks at number 39 and climbed to number 32, and on Modern Rock Tracks at number 37, where it climbed to number 31. It is Buckcherry's first song to reach the adult contemporary charts, peaking at number 26.

Charts

Weekly charts

Year-end charts

Certifications

References

Buckcherry songs
2007 singles
2007 songs
Atlantic Records singles
Eleven Seven Label Group singles
Songs written by Josh Todd
Songs written by Keith Nelson (musician)
Songs written by Marti Frederiksen